Van Reed Farmstead is a historic home and farm located in Pine Township, Warren County, Indiana.  The farmhouse was built in 1856, and is a large two-story, double pile Greek Revival style brick dwelling.  It has a cut stone foundation and a two-story rear wing.  Also on the property are the contributing summer kitchen (1856), two well pits (1856), and a Sweitzer barn (1856).

It was listed on the National Register of Historic Places in 2015.

References

Farms on the National Register of Historic Places in Indiana
Greek Revival houses in Indiana
Houses completed in 1856
Buildings and structures in Warren County, Indiana
National Register of Historic Places in Warren County, Indiana